CJSE-FM is a French language country music radio station in Shediac, New Brunswick, Canada and is licensed to Moncton, New Brunswick, CJSE is owned by Radio Beauséjour Inc.

Owned by Radio Beauséjour Inc., the station received CRTC approval in 1993.

Morning drive host John Richard (JR) has been with CJSE since the latter 1990s. JR, educated and raised in the region, is a pioneer of the Moncton radio market having worked since the mid-1970s. He is a veteran of CKCW (AM), CFQM-FM and the defunct CFNB (AM), respectively.

The station is a member of the Alliance des radios communautaires du Canada.

Repeaters

On February 18, 2010, CJSE applied to the CRTC to change Memramcook's repeater frequency from 101.7 to 92.5 FM and received approval on April 13, 2010. This would prevent interference with CKDH-FM's move from the AM band to 101.7 MHz on the FM band in Amherst, Nova Scotia.

References

External links
CJSE Country 89
 
 

Jse
Jse
Jse
Shediac
Radio stations established in 1993
1993 establishments in New Brunswick